Vital Signs is the fifth studio album by American rock band Survivor and their first with vocalist Jimi Jamison released in September 1984. The album was their second most successful in the U.S., reaching #16 on the Billboard Album charts and being certified platinum by the RIAA. The album includes singles "I Can't Hold Back" which peaked at #13 on Billboard Hot 100 chart, "High on You" reached #8, "The Search Is Over" #4 and "First Night" #53. 

Vital Signs is one of the very few studio albums that remained commercially available by Volcano Entertainment after they took a great deal of their releases out of print in August 2009. Rock Candy Records also remastered the content of Vital Signs and reissued it in 2010, adding "The Moment of Truth" (from The Karate Kid soundtrack) as a bonus track. This was first issued on CD in August 1984 and was issued before the Vinyl and Cassette. The Matrix on the CD that was first initial pressing is “11B1”

Track listing

Rock Candy reissue bonus track

Personnel 

Survivor
 Jimi Jamison – lead vocals
 Jim Peterik – keyboards, backing vocals
 Frankie Sullivan – guitars, backing vocals
 Stephan Ellis – bass
 Marc Droubay – drums

Additional musicians
 Peter Wolf – synthesizers, orchestration (4)
 Billy Lee Lewis – percussion
 Mickey Thomas – backing vocals

Production 
 Ron Nevison – producer, engineer
 Kevin Eddy – assistant engineer
 Nick Sanchez – assistant engineer
 Doug Sax – mastering 
 Mick Higgins – cover concept
 Rick Weigand – cover concept
 Jim Marshall – cover photography 
 John Baruck – direction 
 Alex Kochan – direction

Studios
 Recorded at The Plant Studios (Sausalito, California) and Record Plant (Los Angeles, California).
 Mastered at The Mastering Lab (Hollywood, California).

Charts

References 

1984 albums
Survivor (band) albums
Albums produced by Ron Nevison
Scotti Brothers Records albums
Volcano Entertainment albums